DStv Select 1 is a DStv bouquet of selected TV channels from MultiChoice, a multi-channel digital satellite TV service in Africa. In addition to the TV channels there were selected DMX music and radio channels. By 2010, Select 1 had 34 TV channels and 32 radio channels with a monthly subscription fee of R148 per month. In April 2013, DStv announced that it would be discontinuing the DStv Select 1 and Select 2 bouquets and launch a new package known as DStv Family.
In April 2015, DStv increased the prices on all packages with DStv Select having a monthly subscription fee of R199 for viewers who were still on the package.

Channels

General Entertainment & Movies

100 - DStv Guide
110 - M-Net Action
115 - M-Net City
117 - Universal Channel
132 - CBS Reality 
137 - TCM
161 - Mzanzi Magic
191 - SABC 1
192 - SABC 2
193 - SABC 3
194 - e.tv

Lifestyle

176 - Home Channel
178 - Fashion TV

Documentary

181 - National Geographic Channel
187 - Discovery World

Sport

203 - SuperSport Update
204 - SuperSport Select 1
209 - SuperSport Select 2

Children

305 - Nickelodeon
308- KidsCo
319- Mindset

Music

320 - Channel O
322 - MTV Base
325 - One Gospel

Religion

341 - TBN
343 - Rhema

News & Commerce

400 - BBC World News
401 - CNN International
402 - Sky News
405 - Newzroom Afrika
406 - Al Jazeera International
408 - Parliamentary Service 
409 - CCTV News 
410 - CNBC Africa
412 - Business Day TV 
413 - NDTV 24x7

References

Television stations in South Africa